This is a list of World Heritage Sites in the Arab states, in Western Asia and North Africa, occupying an area stretching from the Atlantic Ocean in the west to the Arabian Sea in the east, and from the Mediterranean Sea.

List
The list below contains an image of the site or part of the site; the name as inscribed by UNESCO; the location; the nominating state party; the criteria met by the site, including if it is a cultural, natural or mixed; the area in hectares and acres, excluding any buffer zones, with a value of zero implying that no data is published by UNESCO; the year the site was inscribed; and a description of the site.

See also
List of World Heritage Sites in Africa
List of World Heritage Sites in Western Asia
Destruction of cultural heritage by ISIL

References

External links
UNESCO World Heritage Centre – Official site
List of UNESCO World Heritage Sites – Official site
VRheritage.org – documentation of World Heritage Sites
Worldheritage-Forum – Information and Weblog on World Heritage Issues

Arab League
Arab states
Arab world-related lists